Print Audit is a private company that provides print tracking and copy auditing tools to  office equipment dealers and end-users. The company's main software product is Print Audit 6.

In addition to its headquarters in Calgary, Alberta, Canada, the company has offices in the United Kingdom, South Africa, Australia and Latin America.

History
The company was co-founded in December 1999 by John MacInnes to create products that could help companies recover the costs associated with photocopying.  Over the next ten years, the company developed print and photocopying products to track, analyze and control the printing patterns of organizations.  The company asserts that to date it has installed print management software on 2 million workstations worldwide.

Products

Print Management Products

Dealer Sales Tools

Awards and recognition
 2012 U.S. Military Certificate of Networthiness

References

 Alberta Venture
 Managed Print Services Association
 Image Source Magazine
 Dunsdon, Nicole. 'The Customer is All Right'. The Globe and Mail, October 14, 2008.
 Calgary Herald
 The Imaging Channel

External links
Print Audit

Companies based in Calgary